Upsilon (υ / Υ) is a Greek letter.

Upsilon may also refer to:

Latin upsilon (Ʊ/ʊ), a Latin letter
Lake Upsilon
Upsilon meson (ϒ)

See also 
Ypsilon (disambiguation)
Ipsilon (disambiguation)
Upsilon Phi Delta
Upsilon Phi Sigma
Upsilon Pi Epsilon
Upsilon Sigma Phi